The 1988–89 Ohio Bobcats men's basketball team represented Ohio University in the college basketball season of 1988–89. The team was coached by Billy Hahn and played their home games at the Convocation Center.

Schedule

|-
!colspan=9 style=| Non-conference regular season

|-
!colspan=9 style=| MAC regular season

|-

|-
!colspan=9 style=| MAC Tournament

Statistics

Team Statistics
Final 1988–89 Statistics

Source

Player statistics

Source

Awards and honors
Paul Graham – MAC Player of the Year

References

General
Ohio Record Book 

Ohio Bobcats men's basketball seasons
Ohio
1988 in sports in Ohio
1989 in sports in Ohio